The Hamangia culture is a Late Neolithic archaeological culture of Dobruja (Romania and Bulgaria) between the Danube and the Black Sea and Muntenia in the south. It is named after the site of Baia-Hamangia, discovered in 1952 along Golovița Lake.

Genesis and successor

The Hamangia culture began around 5250/5200 BC and lasted until around 4550/4500 BC. It was absorbed by the expanding Boian culture in its transition towards the Gumelnița culture.
Its cultural links with Anatolia suggest that it was the result of a recent settlement by people from Anatolia, unlike the neighbouring cultures, which appear descended from earlier Neolithic settlement.

Art

The Hamangia culture attracted and attracts the attention of many art historians because of its exceptional clay figures.

Pottery
Painted vessels with complex geometrical patterns based on spiral-motifs are typical. The shapes include: bowls and cylindric glasses (most of them with arched walls). They are decorated with dots, straight parallel lines and zig-zags, which make Hamangia pottery very original.

Figurines
Pottery figurines are normally extremely stylized and show standing naked faceless women with emphasized breasts and buttocks. Two figurines known as "The Thinker" and "The Sitting woman" are considered masterpieces of Neolithic art.

Gallery

Settlements

Settlements consist of rectangular houses with one or two rooms, built of wattle and daub, sometimes with stone foundations (in Durankulak). They are normally arranged on a rectangular grid and may form small tells. Settlements are located  along the coast, on the coast of lakes, on lower or middle river terraces.

Important sites

The Durankulak lake settlement, now Archaeological Complex Durankulak, commenced on a small island, approximately 7000 BC and around 4700/4600 BC the stone architecture was already in general use and became a characteristic phenomenon that was unique in Europe.
Cernavodă, the necropolis where the famous statues "The Thinker" and "The Sitting Woman" were discovered
The eponymous site of Baia-Hamangia, discovered in 1953 along Lake Golovița, close to the Black Sea coast, in the Romanian province of Dobrogea.

Inhumation

Crouched or extended inhumation in cemeteries. Grave-goods tend to be without pottery in Hamangia I. Grave-goods include flint, worked shells, bone tools and shell-ornaments.

See also
Cycladic art
Varna culture
Vinča culture
Cucuteni-Trypillia culture
Old Europe
Prehistory of Southeastern Europe
History of Bulgaria
Prehistoric Romania
Prehistoric art
List of Stone Age art

References

External links

Archaeological cultures in Romania
Archaeological cultures in Bulgaria
Archaeological cultures of Eastern Europe
Prehistory of Southeastern Europe
Prehistoric art
Neolithic Europe
Prehistoric Bulgaria